Suzanne Davis (born 1953) is an American jazz pianist. She received her Bachelor of Arts from Wellesley College. She composed the score for the independent film In Between as well as several short animated films and videos. She has performed with Phil Grenadier, Greg Hopkins, Ted Kotick, Joe Hunt, and Grover Washington, Jr. She is leader of the Suzanne Davis Trio and Quartet and also performs with the Bart Weisman Jazz Group.
She is an Associate Professor of piano at Berklee College of Music.

Discography
 Hymn to Freedom
 First Set
 A High Tolerance for the Truth

References

American jazz pianists
1953 births
Living people
Women jazz pianists
Berklee College of Music faculty
Piano pedagogues
Wellesley College alumni
20th-century American pianists
20th-century American women pianists
21st-century American pianists
Women music educators
21st-century American women pianists
American women academics